Ridehalgh or Ridealgh is a surname. People with the surname include:
Arthur Ridehalgh (1907-1971), British lawyer and attorney general of Hong Kong 
George Ridehalgh (1835-1892), English businessman
Judith Constance Mary Ridehalgh, later Judith Hart, British politician
Liam Ridehalgh (born 1991), British footballer
Mabel Ridealgh (1898–1989), British politician

See also
Sagar v Ridehalgh & Sons Ltd, 1931 UK labour law case